Timulla is a genus of velvet ants in the family Mutillidae. There are almost 200 described species in Timulla.

Selected species

 Timulla atriceps (Smith, 1855) g
 Timulla barbata b
 Timulla barbigera Mickel, 1937 b
 Timulla bitaeniata (Spinola, 1841) g
 Timulla compressicornis Mickel, 1937 b
 Timulla contigua b
 Timulla criphyla Mickel, 1938 g
 Timulla dominica Mickel, 1938 g
 Timulla dubitata b
 Timulla dubitatiformis Mickel, 1937 b
 Timulla eris Mickel, 1938 g
 Timulla euterpe b
 Timulla ferrugata b
 Timulla floridensis b
 Timulla grotei b
 Timulla guadeloupensis Mickel, 1937 g
 Timulla leona b
 Timulla mediata (Fabricius, 1805) g
 Timulla navasota b
 Timulla oajaca b
 Timulla obtusata Mickel, 1937 g
 Timulla ornatipennis b
 Timulla rectangula (Spinola, 1841) g
 Timulla rufogastra (Lepeletier, 1845) g
 Timulla suspensa Mickel, 1937 b
 Timulla vagans (Fabricius, 1798) b
 Timulla valeria Mickel, 1938 g
 Timulla zonata (Spinola, 1841) g

Data sources: i = ITIS, c = Catalogue of Life, g = GBIF, b = Bugguide.net

References

Further reading

External links

 

Parasitic wasps
Mutillidae